A prediction is a statement or claim that a particular event will occur in the future.

Prediction may also refer to:

Prediction (film), a 1993 Russian film
"Prediction", a song by Steel Pulse from their 1978 album Handsworth Revolution
"The Prediction", a song by Nas from his 1999 album Nastradamus
"The Prediction", a song by A Thorn for Every Heart from their 2004 album Things Aren't So Beautiful Now

See also
:Category:Prediction
Predictable (disambiguation)
Predictor (disambiguation)
Predict (disambiguation)
Prediction interval, a statistical concept
Explanatory power of a theory or hypothesis